The state of Louisiana is served by the following area codes:

 225, which serves the Baton Rouge area and parts of south central Louisiana
 318, which serves northern Louisiana 
 337, which serves southwestern Louisiana
 504, which serves the New Orleans area
 985, which serves the sections of southeast Louisiana which are not within the 504 area code

Area code list
 
Louisiana
Area codes